Shahid Shahmoradi Community ( – Garveh Mashāʿ-ye Shahīd Shāhmorādī) is a village in Sharifabad Rural District, in the Central District of Sirjan County, Kerman Province, Iran. At the 2006 census, its population was 29, in 5 families.

References 

Populated places in Sirjan County